Muriel Powell may refer to:

Muriel Powell (Chailey Heritage and Searchlight) (1889–1972), British nurse, often referred to as Matron Powell
Dame Muriel Powell (nurse) (1914–1978), British nurse, hospital matron, and Chief Nursing Officer for the Scottish Home and Health Department